Eleodes dentipes, the dentate stink beetle, is a species of desert stink beetle in the family Tenebrionidae. It is 16-28 mm in length and common in rotting wood and dry leaves.

References

Further reading

External links

 

Tenebrionidae
Beetles described in 1829